Nick or Nicholas Brown may refer to:

 Nicholas Brown Sr. (1729–1791), American signer of the 1764 charter of what became Brown University
 Nicholas Brown Jr. (1769–1841), Brown University was renamed for him in 1804
 Nicholas Brown III (1792–1859), American Consul to Italy
 Nicholas Brown (pirate) (died 1726), English pirate
 N. E. Brown (Nicholas Edward Brown, 1849–1934), Kew Gardens plant taxonomist
 Nicholas John Brown (1838–1903), Australian politician, Speaker of the Tasmanian House of Assembly
 Nicholas W. Brown (politician) (1821–1889), manufacturer and political figure in Ontario
 Nicholas W. Brown (lawyer), American lawyer
 Nicholas Brown (actor) (born 1980), Australian actor, singer, songwriter and screenwriter
 Nicholas Brown (historian), Australian historian and biographer of  Sir John Crawford
 Nicholas Brown, an alias of Nicholas Alahverdian, American convicted sex offender who faked his death

See also
 Nicholas Browne (disambiguation)
 Nick Brown (disambiguation)
 Nicholas Braun (1988), American actor